Glo is the third full studio album by the band Delirious?. It was released in 2000, just over a year after their previous album Mezzamorphis.

Track listing

Personnel 
Delirious?
 Martin Smith – lead vocals, additional keyboards, guitars 
 Tim Jupp – keyboards, additional programming 
 Stuart Garrard – acoustic guitars, electric guitars, additional programming, backing vocals 
 Jon Thatcher – electric bass, synth bass 
 Stewart Smith – drums, percussion, samples, backing vocals 

Additional musicians
 Tedd T – programming 
 DJ Kenny Mitchell – turntable tweaks, additional beeps
 Robert A. Ash – bagpipes 
 Roderick S. MscDonald – bagpipes
 Hugh MacMillan – bagpipes 
 Gerald Le Feuvre – cello, strings (14)
 Jane Kane – strings (14)
 John Kane – strings (14)
 Chian Lim – strings (14)
 Anna Smith – vocal effects (1)
 Sharlene Hector – harmony vocals (2)
 Tasia Tjornhom – additional backing vocals (2)
 Chuck Zwicky – additional backing vocals (2)
 Arun Community Church Choir – choir
 The Grant Choir – choir

Production 
 Delirious? – producers
 Tedd T – producer, additional recording
 Chuck Zwicky – recording, mixing 
 Martin Smith – additional recording
 Andrew Lower – recording assistant
 Damon Riley – recording assistant 
 Andy Searle-Barnes – recording assistant 
 Nik Smith – recording assistant 
 Neil Stainton – recording assistant
 Paul Burton – monks recording 
 Tim Jupp – monks recording
 Chris Blair – mastering 
 Giles Lambert – creative direction, art direction 
 Stewart Smith – creative direction, art direction 
 Andy Hutch – photography 
 Mitch Jenkins – photography 
 Catherine Hughes – stylist 
 Tony Patoto – band management 

Studios
 Recorded at Clarion Studios (Brighton, UK); Ford Lane Studios (Ford, West Sussex, UK); Westside Studios (London, UK); Ampleforth Abbey Church (Ampleforth, York, UK); Antenna Studios (Nashville, Tennessee, USA).
 Mixed at Jacobs Studios (Farnham, Surrey, UK).
 Mastered at Abbey Road Studios (London, UK).

References

2000 albums
Delirious? albums